The Seniors United Party of Australia (SUPA) is a deregistered Australian political party. It was known as Seniors United NSW until 3 March 2016. 
The party was founded by Ray Morritt, Nick Agnew, Frank Fitzpatrick and Neil Smith who were dissatisfied with the NSW Government's legislation on retirement villages and other seniors issues. The party was deregistered by the AEC on 29 June 2022.

History
The party's first three candidates were in the 2016 federal election to represent New South Wales in the Australian Senate. The candidates were Gillian Evans, Kerry Koliadis and Chris Osborne. Evans was ranked as the 26th  candidate out of 151 and the party ranked 17th out of 41 groups on the New South Wales Senate ballot paper, counting only first preferences.

The party fielded a candidate in the 2017 byelection for New England. Warwick Stacey polled 16th of the 17 candidates, with 0.39% of the vote.

On 7 February 2018, the Australian Electoral Commission (AEC) issued a notice that it was considering deregistering the party on the grounds that it had ceased to have at least 500 members. In May 2018 the AEC approved the party to continue its registration after the party requested and was granted a 2nd membership review which it passed.

In October 2018 the party merged with the Pensioners, Veterans & Seniors Party.

The party was de-registered in March 2021 for failing to have 500 members. After an appeal, the party was reregistered in November 2021.

In 2022, New South Wales Legislative Councillor Fred Nile joined the party after the dissolution of the Christian Democratic Party, intending to become the party's first sitting member. However, SUPA was not registered with NSWEC and was deregistered as a federal party less than two months later.

References

Pensioners' parties in Australia
Pensioners' parties
Political parties in New South Wales
2015 establishments in Australia
2022 disestablishments in Australia
Political parties established in 2015
Conservative parties in Australia
Political parties disestablished in 2022
Defunct political parties in Australia
Right-wing politics in Australia
Social conservative parties